The Gould GR55, and its evolution, the GR55B, are open-wheel race cars, designed, developed and built by British company Gould Racing, specifically for the British Sprint Championship, since 2003.

References 

Open wheel racing cars